James Tully (1883–1949) was an English footballer who played for Clapton Orient and Rochdale.

References

Leyton Orient F.C. players
Rochdale A.F.C. players
English footballers
1883 births
1949 deaths
Association football wing halves